National Highway 148N (NH 148N) is a National Highway in India.

References

External links

148N